This is a list of wildlife sanctuaries in Bangladesh. Between 1981 and 2017, 20 wildlife sanctuaries were established in the country that cover  as of 2020. Among them, three wildlife sanctuaries are located at Sundarbans, the World Heritage Site.

List

See also
 List of protected areas of Bangladesh

References 

Wildlife sanctuaries
Wildlife sanctuaries of Bangladesh